Club Deportivo Estradense is a Spanish football team based in A Estrada, in the autonomous community of Galicia. Founded in 1925, but it was federated in 1959. It plays in Tercera División RFEF – Group 1, holding home matches at Nuevo Campo Municipal, with a 600-seat capacity.

Season to season

11 seasons in Tercera División
1 season in Tercera División RFEF

References

External links
Official website 
Futbolme team profile 

Football clubs in Galicia (Spain)
Association football clubs established in 1959
Divisiones Regionales de Fútbol clubs
1959 establishments in Spain